Magelonidae is a family of annelids belonging to the order Spionida.

Genera:
 Dannychaeta Chen, Parry, Vinther, Zhai, Hou & Ma, 2020
 Magelona Müller, 1858
 Meridithia Hernández-Alcántara & Solís-Weiss, 2000
 Octomagelona Aguirrezabalaga, Ceberio & Fiege, 2001

References

Annelids